Chimaphila menziesii, known by the common names little prince's pine and Little Pipsissewa,  is a species of perennial wildflower in the heath family.

Distribution
This plant is found scattered throughout the mountains of western North America where it grows in the understory of coniferous forests.  It is native to the Western United States and Southwest Canada.

Description
Chimaphila menziesii is a short flower with a slender reddish stem not exceeding 15 centimeters. The leaves are lance-shaped and a leathery rich green with light veins and tiny widely spaced teeth along the edges.

The inflorescence atop the stem produces hanging flowers on long stalks. Each flower is white to dark pink, with spreading petals around a thick center. A ring of stamens with large tubular anthers surrounds an ovary with a large buttonlike stigma. It is similar to, but smaller than, its relative the prince's pine, Chimaphila umbellata.

Uses
The plant was used to make treatments to break up kidney stones or gallstones; the name Pipsissewa likely derives from the Cree word pipsisikuweu ('it breaks into little pieces').

References

External links
Jepson Manual Treatment
Ecology
Photo gallery

menziesii
Flora of the Western United States
Flora of British Columbia
Flora of California
Flora of Montana
Flora of Nevada
Flora of Oregon
Flora of Utah
Flora of the Sierra Nevada (United States)
Natural history of the California Coast Ranges
Natural history of the Peninsular Ranges
Natural history of the Transverse Ranges
Flora without expected TNC conservation status